Warzycha is a Polish surname. It may refer to:
 Krzysztof Warzycha (born 1964), Polish footballer
 Robert Warzycha (born 1963), Polish footballer
 Konrad Warzycha (born 1989), Polish footballer
 Walter Warzecha (1891–1956), German naval commander

See also
 

Polish-language surnames